Lianzhou is a town of Hepu County, Guangxi, China. , it has 15 residential communities, 16 villages and one industrial park community under its administration.

References

Towns of Guangxi
Hepu County